Antônio Renato Aragão (born January 13, 1935), nicknamed Didi, is a Brazilian comedian actor, producer, filmmaker, TV presenter, singer and writer. He is best known as Didi, because of his leading role in the television series Os Trapalhões. 

Didi was born in Sobral, Ceará. He obtained a degree in Law in 1961, but has never worked as a lawyer. For many years he was the host of the TV programme Criança Esperança on Globo TV.

Filmography

Television series
Vídeo Alegre (TV Ceará, 1961–1963)
A E I O URCA (TV Tupi, 1964–1965)
Os Legionários (TV Excelsior, 1965–1966)
A Cidade Se Diverte (TV Excelsior, 1965–1966)
Adoráveis Trapalhões (TV Excelsior, 1965–1966)
Uma Graça, Mora? (TV Record, 1966–1969)
Praça da Alegria (TV Record, 1966–1969)
Quartel do Barulho (TV Record, 1966–1969)
Café sem Concerto (TV Tupi, 1970–1971)
Os Insociáveis (TV Record, 1972–1974)
Os Trapalhões (TV Tupi, 1974–1976)
Os Trapalhões (TV Globo, 1976–1993)
Criança Esperança (TV Globo, 1986–2012)
Os Trapalhões – Melhores Momentos de Todos os Tempos (reruns, TV Globo, 1994–1997)
Os Trapalhões em Portugal (TV SIC, Portugal, 1994–1997)
A Turma do Didi (TV Globo, 1998–2010–).
Aventuras do Didi (TV Globo, 2010-2013)

Cinema

Discography
1974 – Os Trapalhões – Volume 1
1975 – Os Trapalhões – Volume 2
1979 – Os Trapalhões na TV
1981 – O Forró dos Trapalhões
1981 – Os Saltimbancos Trapalhões
1982 – Os Vagabundos Trapalhões
1982 – Os Trapalhões na Serra Pelada
1983 – O Cangaceiro Trapalhão
1984 – O Trapalhão na Arca de Noé
1984 – Os Trapalhões e o Mágico de Oroz
1984 – Os Trapalhões
1985 – A Filha dos Trapalhões
1987 – Os Trapalhões
1988 – Os Trapalhões
1991 – Amigos do Peito – 25 Anos de Trapalhões
1995 – Os Trapalhões em Portugal
1996 – Trapalhões e Seus Amigos
2000 – Didi & Sua Turma

Filmography

Solo
1966 – Adorável Trapalhão
1968 – Dois Na Lona
1983 – O Trapalhão na Arca de Noé
2000 – O Anjo Trapalhão
2003 – Didi, o Cupido Trapalhão
2004 – Didi Quer ser Criança
2005 – Didi, O Caçador de Tesouros
2006 – O Cavaleiro Didi e a Princesa Lili
2007 – Didi e a Pequena Ninja
2009 - Uma Noite no Castelo - TV movie
2010 - A Princesa e o Vagabundo - TV movie
2014 - Didi e o Segredo dos Anjos - TV movie
2017 - Os Saltimbancos Trapalhões: Rumo a Hollywood

with Dedé Santana
1971 – Bonga, O Vagabundo
1997 – O Noviço Rebelde
1998 – Simão, o Fantasma Trapalhão
1999 – O Trapalhão e a Luz Azul

with Os Trapalhões
1966 – A Ilha dos Paqueras
1966 – Na Onda do Iê-Iê-Iê
1972 – Ali Babá e os Quarenta Ladrões
1973 – Aladim e a Lâmpada Maravilhosa
1974 – Robin Hood, O Trapalhão da Floresta
1975 – O Trapalhão na Ilha do Tesouro
1976 – O Trapalhão no Planalto dos Macacos
1977 – Simbad, O Marujo Trapalhão
1977 – O Trapalhão nas Minas do Rei Salomão
1978 – Os Trapalhões na Guerra dos Planetas
1979 – O Cinderelo Trapalhão
1979 – O Rei e os Trapalhões
1980 – Os Três Mosqueteiros Trapalhões
1980 – O Incrível Monstro Trapalhão
1981 – Os Saltimbancos Trapalhões
1982 – Os Trapalhões na Serra Pelada
1982 – Os Vagabundos Trapalhões
1983 – O Cangaceiro Trapalhão
1984 – Os Trapalhões e o Mágico de Oróz
1984 – A Filha dos Trapalhões
1985 – Os Trapalhões no Reino da Fantasia
1986 – Os Trapalhões no Rabo do Cometa
1986 – Os Trapalhões e o Rei do Futebol
1987 – Os Fantasmas Trapalhões
1987 – Os Trapalhões no Auto da Compadecida
1988 – Os Heróis Trapalhões - Uma Aventura na Selva
1988 – O Casamento dos Trapalhões
1989 – A Princesa Xuxa e os Trapalhões
1989 – Os Trapalhões na Terra dos Monstros
1990 – Uma Escola Atrapalhada
1990 – O Mistério de Robin Hood
1991 – Os Trapalhões E A Árvore da Juventude

References

External links
Renato Aragão at IMDb
Trapalhoes.hpg – Informações gerais sobre Renato Aragão e os Trapalhões
Página sobre o humorista e o grupo Os Trapalhões
Página de Renato Aragão na Unicef
Biografia de Renato Aragão
Página oficial de "A Turma do Didi"
Renato Aragão – Galeria

1935 births
Living people
Brazilian male comedians
Brazilian male film actors
Brazilian male television actors
Os Trapalhões
Recipients of the Order of Cultural Merit (Brazil)
People from Sobral, Ceará